The Kamchatka Military Flotilla is a flotilla of the Russian Navy.
On December 14, 1849, in accordance with the Decree of Emperor Nicholas I, the Okhotsk military flotilla was transferred to Petropavlovsk-Kamchatsky in Kamchatka. Thus December 14 became marked as the celebratory "Day" of the flotilla/NEGTF.

Formed in 1945, the Kamchatka Flotilla of diverse forces was reorganized during the 1960s; on 15 October 1979 the Kamchatka Flotilla was formed (or reformed). In March 1998 the Northeastern Group of Troops and Forces was created from the Kamchatka Flotilla. It was based on the Kamchatka Peninsula and had responsibility for a coastal zone of the Pacific Ocean. On April 30, 1975, the flotilla was awarded the Order of the Red Banner.

The Kamchatka Flotilla's forces in 1988 included the 173rd Anti-Submarine Warfare Brigade (Ilicheva Bay, Petropavlovsk-Kamchatka); 114th Coastal Defence Brigade; 182nd Submarine Brigade (Krasheninnikova Bay, Kamchatka Oblast); and the 104th independent Hydrographic Ship Battalion at Petropavlovsk-Kamchatka.

Until 1 June 2002, the 22nd Motor Rifle Division of the Far East Military District was located on the peninsula. It then became the 40th independent Motorised Rifle Brigade. In September 2007 it became the 40th Independent (twice Red Banner) Krasnodar-Harbin twice Red Banner Naval Infantry Brigade. This situation lasted until March, 2009 when it became the 3rd Naval Infantry Regiment, and later the 40th Naval Infantry Brigade.

Order of battle 
It includes:

Ship and Vessel units

 114th Coastal Defence Brigade (Petropavlovsk-Kamchatsky);
 117th Coastal Defence Division (Petropavlovsk-Kamchatsky);
 66th Separate Missile Ship Division (Acha Bay);
 10th Submarine Division (Vilyuchinsk);
 25th Submarine Division (Tarja Bay);
 32nd Auxiliary Unit (Zavoiko Peninsula);

Marines

40th Separate Naval Infantry Brigade (Petropavlovsk-Kamchatsky);

Coastal Defense units

520th Separate Missile Brigade (Sakhalin and The Kuril Islands); 
 Eight surface-to-surface missile divizions (battalions), three on Sakhalin, two on Iturup Island, and three elsewhere

Aviation and Air Defence units (see :ru:Елизово (аэропорт))
 865th Separate Fighter Regiment (Elizovo Airport, transferred to OKVS (Troops and Forces of the North-East) July 1, 1998);
 317th Separate Aviation Regiment (Elizovo, status needs to be confirmed)
 175th Helicopter Anti-ship Squadron (Elizovo, status needs to be confirmed);
 216th Electronic Warfare Regiment (Ozyorny);
 1532nd Air Defence Regiment (Petropavlovsk-Kamchatsky)

Command

Commanders of the Flotilla 
 1945-1946 - Rear Admiral I. I. Baykov
 1946-1948 - Rear Admiral N. I. Vinogradov
 1951-1954 - Rear Admiral L. N. Panteleyev
 1954-1959 - Rear Admiral G. I. Shchedrin
 1966-1971 - Rear Admiral B. E. Yamkovoi
 1971-1973 - Rear Admiral V. V. Sidorov
 1973-1978 - Rear Admiral I. M. Kapitanets
 1978-1980 - Vice-Admiral N. G. Klitniy
 1980-1983 - Vice Admiral G. A. Khvatov
 1983-1986 - Vice-Admiral D. M. Komarov
 1986-1989 - Vice Admiral G. N. Gurinov
 1989-1993 - Vice-Admiral Y. I. Shumarin
 1993-1995 - Vice-Admiral V. T. Kharnikov
 1995-1998 - Vice-Admiral V. F. Dorogin

Commander of the Northeastern Group of Troops and Forces 
 1998-2000 - Vice-Admiral V. F. Dorogin 
 2000-2001 - Vice-Admiral K. S. Sidenko
 2002-2006 - Vice-Admiral V. F. Gavrikov 
 2006-2009 - Rear Admiral A. V. Vitko
 2009-2012 - Rear Admiral K. G. Maklov 
 2012-2014 - Rear Admiral V. N. Liina
 2014-2016 - Rear Admiral S. V. Lipilin 
 Since 2016 - Acting Rear Admiral Sergei Zhuga

Chiefs of Staff of the Flotilla 
 1948-1949 - captain of the first rank S.А. Canapadze
 1951-1957 - Rear Admiral M.G. Tomsk
 1957-1963 - Rear Admiral A.B. Teisher's
 1963-1968 - Rear Admiral Yu.S. Russin
 1972-1976 - Rear Admiral N.G. Customer
 1984-1986 - Rear Admiral G.N. Gurinov
 1986-1989 - Rear Admiral Yu.I. Shumanin
 1989-1994 - Rear Admiral  M.G. Kulak
 1994-1995 - Rear Admiral V.F. Dorogin
 1995-1998 - Rear Admiral M.F. Abramov

First Deputy Flotilla Commander 
 1976-1979 - Rear Admiral A.I. Skvortsov
 1979-1982 - Rear Admiral N.G. Logky
 1987-1991 - Rear Admiral N.D. Zakorin
 1991-1994 - Rear Admiral V.F. Dorogin
 1994-1998 - Rear Admiral M.G. Kulak

Notes

External links 
 December 1, 1945 Formed Kamchatka military flotilla
 The birthday of the Kamchatka military flotilla of the Pacific Fleet is dedicated ...

Naval units and formations of Russia
Naval units and formations of the Soviet Union
Military units and formations established in 1945
Kamchatka Peninsula
1945 establishments in the Soviet Union